Moesia is a Sofia Metro station on the M3 line. It was opened on 24 April 2021 as part of the second section of the line, from Ovcha kupel to Gorna Banya. The preceding station is Ovcha kupel II and the adjacent station is Ovcha kupel.

Location 
The station's two east entrances are located on the Montevideo blvd. in the Ovcha kupel 1 microdistrict, while the other two west entrances are located on the station's own buffer parking, in close proximity to the 88th middle school.

Interchange with other public transport 

• City Bus service: 60, 73

• Suburban Bus service: 59

References 

Sofia Metro stations
Railway stations opened in 2021
2021 establishments in Bulgaria